Roshtkhar Rural District is a rural district (dehestan) in the Central District of Roshtkhar County, Razavi Khorasan Province, Iran. At the 2006 census, its population was 16,536, in 3,876 families.  The rural district has 27 villages.

References 

Rural Districts of Razavi Khorasan Province
Roshtkhar County